Yeolmu-kimchi or young summer radish kimchi is one of the many types of Kimchi, a popular banchan (Korean: 반찬, Korean side dish). Although yeolmu radish (young summer radish) has small and thin taproots that do not have much use, its thick and abundant green leaves are constantly used throughout spring and summer to make yeolmu-kimchi. Yeolmu-kimchi is popular in the summer and is often eaten with cold noodles.

Preparation

In preparation, all the withered and rugged leaves are removed from the yeolmu radish. The roots remain uncut and the ends are simply trimmed. With a knife, the thick roots are gently scraped and all the soil is removed from the young radish. Afterwards, it is sprinkled with salt water. Green onions are cut diagonally and the garlic and ginger are mashed. The red pepper is sliced into small bits.

In the immersion process, the yeolmu is slightly washed and cut into pieces convenient for eating. Afterwards, the red pepper, the mashed garlic, the ginger, the green onions and shrimp sauce are mixed together with the young radish. At the end, a small amount of salt water is added to the mixture.

Health

Due to the softness and flavor of the leaves, they are the primary ingredients in many foods rather than the roots (the white radish). The leaves are alkaline foods rich in fiber, vitamin A, vitamin C, and low in calories. When picking out yeolmu, young, small and thin ones are recommended over the aged yeolmu, which tend to be thicker. It is recommended that Yeolmu is eaten as soon as possible due to the fact that it withers quickly. Any leftovers are stored in refrigeration.

Popularity

On January 30, 2013, Yeolmu Kimchi was voted as people's favourite type of Kimchi (excluding Napa Cabbage Kimchi, which is the most commonly eaten type of Kimchi) in an online poll. In the poll, which involved a total of 3532 bloggers, Yeolmu Kimchi received 875 (24.8%) votes. Dongchimi came 2nd with 13.9% of the votes.

References

External links
  Yeolmu Kimchi Recipe
 Kimchi Types

Kimchi